The Ards Community Hospital is a health facility in Church Street, Newtownards, Northern Ireland. It is managed by the South Eastern Health and Social Care Trust.

History
The facility has its origins in the Newtownards Union Workhouse which was designed by George Wilkinson and was completed in December 1841. It became the Ards District Hospital in 1932 and, after joining the National Health Service in 1948, evolved to become Ards Community Hospital. In 2016 the gate lodge for the hospital was refurbished to create a social enterprise café. The hospital was used as a location for the filming of Dublin Murders in 2018.

References 

South Eastern Health and Social Care Trust
Hospitals established in 1841
1841 establishments in Ireland
Hospital buildings completed in 1841
Health and Social Care (Northern Ireland) hospitals
Hospitals in County Down
19th-century architecture in Northern Ireland